Pouncey is a surname. Notable people with the surname include:

Maurkice Pouncey (born 1989), American football player
Mike Pouncey (born 1989), American football player, twin brother of Maurkice
Peter Pouncey (born 1937), British author, classicist, and university president